The Sebring International Grand Prix of Endurance, was a non-championship race. The race was held at the Sebring International Raceway, on March 15, 1952. Victory overall went to the No. 9 J. S. Donaldson Frazer Nash Le Mans Replica driven by Larry Kulok and Harry Grey.

Race results
Class winners in bold.

References

12 Hours of Sebring
12 Hours of Sebring
12 Hours Of Sebring